The Chickasaw are a Native American people.

Chickasaw may also refer to:

Chickasaw language, spoken by the tribe
Chickasaw Nation

Places in the United States
Chickasaw, Alabama
Chickasaw, Louisville, a neighborhood of Louisville, Kentucky
Chickasaw, Ohio
Chickasaw, Louisville, a neighborhood of Louisville, Kentucky
Chickasaw, Pennsylvania
Chickasaw County (disambiguation), counties of that name in different states

Other
Chickasaw Council, of the Boy Scouts of America in Memphis, TN
Memphis Chicks (Southern Association), a minor league baseball team from 1901 to 1960
Memphis Chicks (Southern League), a minor league baseball team from 1978 to 1997
Sikorsky H-19 Chickasaw, a helicopter
, various United States Navy ships

See also
Chickasaw State Park (disambiguation)